Ingrid Butts (born July 30, 1963) is an American cross-country skier. She competed at the 1992 Winter Olympics and the 1994 Winter Olympics.

Cross-country skiing results
All results are sourced from the International Ski Federation (FIS).

Olympic Games

World Championships

World Cup

Season standings

References

External links
 

1963 births
Living people
American female cross-country skiers
Olympic cross-country skiers of the United States
Cross-country skiers at the 1992 Winter Olympics
Cross-country skiers at the 1994 Winter Olympics
Skiers from Denver
21st-century American women